Epicriopsis is a genus of mites in the family Ameroseiidae. There are about 10 described species in Epicriopsis.

Species
These 10 species belong to the genus Epicriopsis:
 Epicriopsis atuberculatus Narita & Moraes, 2016
 Epicriopsis horrida (Kramer, 1876)
 Epicriopsis hungaricus Kandil, 1978
 Epicriopsis jilinensis Ma, 2002
 Epicriopsis linzhiensis Ma & Lin, 2016
 Epicriopsis mirabilis Wilmann, 1956
 Epicriopsis palustris Karg, 1971
 Epicriopsis stellata Ishikawa, 1972
 Epicriopsis suedus Karg, 1971
 Epicriopsis walteri Halliday, 1997

References

External links

 

Ameroseiidae
Articles created by Qbugbot